A swarm is a group of animals that aggregate and travel in the same direction.

Swarm or swarming may also refer to:

Biology 
 Swarming motility, a type of bacterial motility
 Swarming (honey bee), the natural means of reproduction of honey bee colonies
 Swarm behaviour, examples and mathematical models

Technology and computing 
 Swarm (app), a mobile app by Foursquare
 Swarm intelligence, artificial intelligence technique
 Swarm robotics, approach to the coordination of multirobot systems
 Swarm (ESA mission), a European Space Agency satellite mission to measure Earth's magnetic field
 Swarm (simulation), multi-agent simulation package
 SWARM, a remote weapon system
 Swarming (military), an approach of using "pulses" of converging combat agents onto a target
 Docker (software), software to provide clustering functionality for Docker containers
 Swarm Technologies Inc. Building a LEO satellite constellation for Internet-Of-Things (IOT) device communications.

Fiction and entertainment

Character
 Swarm (comics), Marvel Comics supervillain
 Swarm (Transformers), Transformer character
 Swarm, the name of an Air-element character in Skylanders: Giants

Literature
 "Swarm" (novelette), a 1982 science fiction novelette written by Bruce Sterling
 The Swarm (Schätzing novel), a 2004 science fiction novel by Frank Schätzing
 The Swarm (Card and Johnston novel), a 2016 science fiction novel by Orson Scott Card and Aaron Johnston

Film and television
 The Swarm (1978 film), a 1978 disaster film about a killer bee invasion
 Destination: Infestation, a 2007 TV film released on DVD as Swarm or Deadly Swarm
 The Swarm (2020 film), French horror film about locusts
 Swarm (TV series), a 2023 Amazon Prime Video horror-thriller series

Game
 Swarm (1998 video game), for IBM PC compatibles
 Swarm (2011 video game), for Xbox 360 and PlayStation 3

Music
 "Swarm", a song by Badmarsh & Shri from the album Signs

Other 
 Earthquake swarm, a series of earthquakes in one area
 Georgia Swarm, a box lacrosse team in the National Lacrosse League
 Swarm (spirit organization), a spirit organization for the Georgia Tech Yellow Jackets
 Swarm Development Group, an American non-profit organization
 Swarm Peak, a rock peak in the Ford Ranges, Marie Byrd Land, Antarctica
 Swarm!, an album by Torture Killer

See also 
 The Swarm (disambiguation)